Lesbian, gay, bisexual and transgender (LGBT) people in Liechtenstein enjoy many, but not all, of the same rights as non-LGBT people. Same-sex sexual activity has been legal since 1989, with an equal age of consent since 2001. Same-sex couples have had access to registered partnerships since 2011, and discrimination on the basis of sexual orientation has been outlawed in some areas since 2016.

Law regarding same-sex sexual activity
Same-sex sexual activity was legalized in 1989 by the removal of Sections 129 and 130 of the Criminal Code, though the age of consent was not equalized until 2001. The Penal Code was revised in December 2000 to remove all discrimination against same-sex sexual activity, taking effect in 2001. The age of consent is 14, regardless of gender and sexual orientation.

Recognition of same-sex relationships

In 2001, the Free List, one of the three political parties in the country, began working on a draft for a same-sex partnership law. The paper was accepted by the Landtag and given to the Liechtenstein Government. The proposed registered partnership bill was rejected by the Parliament in summer 2003. A new proposal by the Free List was adopted by the Landtag with a majority of 19 votes to 6 on 24 October 2007. Justice Minister Aurelia Frick presented the draft of the registered partnership bill in April 2010. On 23 November, the government approved the final version of the bill. On 16 December 2010, it was approved by the Landtag in the first reading. It passed its second reading on 16 March and was published on 21 March 2011. A group Vox Populi announced its intention to force a referendum on the matter. According to the Constitution, the organization had 30 days to collect at least 1,000 signatures. A referendum was held on 17 and 19 June 2011 and 68.8% of voters approved the law, which then went into effect on 1 September 2011.

According to a report approved by the Liechtenstein government in October 2022, the current partnership law uses "gender-equitable formulations" in its general clauses and legal definitions, implying that both same-sex and opposite-sex couples can enter into registered partnerships under the current law.

Since 1 January 2017, registered partners have been allowed to have a common "name" as equivalent to a "family name" for married couples.

In 2018, a gay couple filed suit in court, arguing that the same-sex marriage ban is in violation of the European Convention on Human Rights and the Constitution of Liechtenstein. Although a court of first instance initially ruled for the couple, the State Court (StGH) ruled in September 2019 that banning same-sex marriage is not unconstitutional. However, the court concluded that several provisions of the 2011 partnership law were discriminatory, notably its provisions prohibiting civil partners from adopting their stepchildren (so-called stepchild adoption).

On 21 September 2022, a motion calling on the government to introduce a bill legalizing same-sex marriage was submitted to the Landtag by 15 out of the 25 sitting members. The motion was discussed in the plenary session on 2 November 2022, and was passed by a 23–2 vote.

Adoption and parenting
On 1 January 2016, during his annual New Year's Day interview, Prince Hans-Adam II announced his opposition to allowing same-sex couples to adopt children.

In September 2019, the State Court ordered the Liechtenstein Government to look into the legalisation of stepchild adoption for civil partners. 
On 15 June 2021, the State Court of Liechtenstein ruled that registered partners should have the right to adopt, and invalidated the sections of the 2011 partnership law which had forbidden such adoptions. It gave Parliament one year to rectify the issue. Following the court decision, the government drafted a bill granting same-sex couples the right to adopt their stepchildren (i.e. stepchild adoption), which was passed on 6 May 2022. On that same day, Parliament narrowly rejected an amendment that would have excluded same-sex couples from joint adoption and procedures for reproductive medicine for those in registered partnerships. 

After a consultation period lasting from 6 July to 30 September 2022, the government passed a motion on full adoption equality for same-sex couples on 31 October 2022. The proposal was discussed in its first reading in the Landtag on 2 December 2022 and was passed in a 22 to 3 vote.

a. Part of the VU-FBP Coalition under Prime Minister Daniel Risch.
b. Served as a substitute deputy for Bettina Petzold-Mähr throughout the plenary legislative session.

Discrimination protections
On 22 February 2005, following a department reorganisation, the Department of Equal Opportunities was assigned to include discrimination on sexual orientation in its area of responsibility.

The Act on Media, enacted in October 2005, declares that media content will be considered illegal if it incites or supports discrimination based on racial or ethnic origin, gender, religion, age, disability or sexual orientation.

Since 1 April 2016, harassment and incitement to hatred on the basis of sexual orientation has been banned in Liechtenstein, punishable by up to two years' imprisonment. Section 283(1) of the Penal Code states:
 (German): 
 (English): Any person shall be punished with imprisonment of up to two years who publicly incites hatred or discrimination against another person or any group of persons on the grounds of their race, language, nationality, ethnic origin, religion or ideology, their gender, disability, age or sexual orientation.

Section 283(6) of the Penal Code prohibits discrimination in public facilities on the basis of, among other categories, sexual orientation.

Blood donation
Liechtenstein follows the same blood donation rules as Austria, where blood donation rules have been non-discriminatory toward LGBT people since summer 2022.

Living conditions
A gay and lesbian organization, Flay, was founded in 1998, and organizes social activities for LGBT people in the triangular area between Liechtenstein, Vorarlberg (Austria) and the Swiss Rhine Valley.

Privacy and individual rights are regarded as fundamental assets of Liechtensteiner society. Open and public discrimination against LGBT people is extremely rare and almost completely unheard of. Despite Liechtenstein's reputation as a conservative Catholic nation, same-sex couples and LGBT people more generally face little social differences compared to heterosexuals and are accepted and tolerated. The country is often compared to "a huge family where everyone knows each other and minds their own business with little interference from others". Due partly to the small population, there are no specific gay bars or venues.

A 2017 online poll conducted by the Liechtensteiner Vaterland found majority support for the legalisation of same-sex marriage, at 69%.

Summary table

a. (Indirectly categorized as 'reproductive medicine' & 'medically assisted medicine'): Read Sections 2 & 4.2 (pages 12 & 15 through 16 (top paragraph) respectively) of the provided reference link for details.

See also

Human rights in Liechtenstein
LGBT rights in Europe

Notes

References